Sir Frederick Widdowson Doidge  (26 February 1884 – 26 May 1954) was a journalist in New Zealand and England, then a National Party member in the New Zealand House of Representatives.

Biography

Early life and career
Doidge was born in Cootamundra, New South Wales, Australia. His father, Edwin Doidge, was a journalist in Thames, New Zealand, and founded the Cootamundra Liberal in August 1882 in competition with the Cootamundra Herald. Frederick Doidge received his training as a journalist from his father. Doidge came to New Zealand in 1902.

Political career

In the 1935 election, Doidge ran as an Independent in the  electorate after having had a brief encounter with the anti-Labour New Zealand Democrat Party. Of the four candidates, he came second after Labour's Alexander Moncur. The next year he ran as the new National Party's candidate in the 1936 Manukau by-election, becoming the first National candidate to run for election in history. He was defeated by Labour candidate Arthur Osborne.

Doidge then represented the electorate of Tauranga for National from 1938 to 1951, when he retired.

He served as both Minister of External Affairs and Minister of Island Territories from 1950 to 1951 in the First National Government of New Zealand. Later, Doidge became New Zealand's High Commissioner to the United Kingdom from 1951 until his death. He was appointed a Knight Commander of the Order of St Michael and St George in the 1953 New Year Honours, and awarded the Queen Elizabeth II Coronation Medal.

Death
Doidge died in London on 26 May 1954 from cancer.

References

New Zealand National Party MPs
New Zealand foreign ministers
Members of the Cabinet of New Zealand
1884 births
1954 deaths
Australian emigrants to New Zealand
New Zealand people of World War I
New Zealand Democrat Party (1934) politicians
High Commissioners of New Zealand to the United Kingdom
New Zealand MPs for North Island electorates
New Zealand Knights Commander of the Order of St Michael and St George
Unsuccessful candidates in the 1935 New Zealand general election
Members of the New Zealand House of Representatives
People from the Riverina
New Zealand politicians awarded knighthoods